Zbyněk Novák (born July 23, 1983) is a Czech former professional ice hockey forward.

Novák played 43 games in the Czech Extraliga for HC Slavia Praha between 2001 and 2003. He was drafted 191st overall by the Washington Capitals in the 2001 NHL Entry Draft but he remained in the Czech Republic throughout his career.

Novák represented the Czech Republic at junior level, playing in the 2001 IIHF World U18 Championships and the 2003 World Junior Ice Hockey Championships.

Career statistics

Regular season and playoffs

International

References

External links

1983 births
Living people
HC Berounští Medvědi players
Czech ice hockey forwards
HC Havířov players
BK Havlíčkův Brod players
HC Kobra Praha players
HC Slavia Praha players
Washington Capitals draft picks